The 2012–13 Iraq football season is Duhok FC's eleventh consecutive season in the Premier League. The club will be participating in the AFC cup, and also competing in the League Cup and the FA Cup.
The league's format has changed once again this season, following the switch from a two-group format to a traditional league last season. A total of 18 teams are contesting the league, two fewer than last season. As a result of this, the bottom four teams in the 2011-12 season were relegated but only two were promoted from the Iraq Division 1. These two promoted teams were Naft Al-Janoob and Sulaymaniya.
The winner and the runner-up qualify to the 2014 AFC Cup. However unlike previous seasons, the 3rd place this season will not take part in the next UAFA Cup that because the spot is reserved for the 2012–13 Iraq FA Cup champions.
4 teams will be relegated to Iraq Division 1 and 2 teams will be promoted for next season 2013–14

Kit providers
LIG

Clubs season-progress

2013 AFC Cup

Group C

Current squad

Top scorers

References 

goalzz.com
duhoksportclub.com
goal.com
worldfootball.net
Goalzz.com
Iraqi League
League table
Iraqi League 2012/2013 at Soccerway

Iraqi football clubs 2012–13 season
Duhoc SC seasons